Jim Bambra (born 1956) is a British designer and reviewer of fantasy roleplaying games (RPG), and a former company director. He is particularly known for his contributions to Dungeons and Dragons, Fighting Fantasy, Warhammer, and Star Wars: The Roleplaying Game which was based on the Star Wars films. Later he became head of design at MicroProse, then managing director of Pivotal Games, a publisher of video games including Conflict: Desert Storm.

Career
Jim Bambra worked on game design and materials for various companies during the 1980s and early 1990s, including TSR (publisher of Dungeons and Dragons), Games Workshop (Warhammer), and West End Games (Star Wars RPG).

In 1983, Bambra wrote "The Beginner’s Guide to Roleplaying Games" (with Paul Ruiz), published in Imagine magazine Issue 6 (Sept 1983), explaining what an RPG is and accompanied by a comic strip, "The Adventures of Nic Novice". He was a reviewer and writer for Imagine magazine 1983-1985, and reviewer for White Dwarf and Dragon magazines during the late 1980s and early 1990s.

In 1989, Bambra co-wrote the Fighting Fantasy gamebook Dead of Night for Puffins, a Penguin inprint, with Stephen Hand.

During the 1990s he was Head of Design at MicroProse, where he worked on projects including Fields of Glory, Grand Prix, Special Forces, various X-COM products, and Gunship.

In 1996 Bambra founded Pumpkin Studios, which achieved success with Warzone 2100, a computer game with a post-nuclear scenario. This company closed in 2000 after Eidos Interactive cancelled its then current project, Saboteur, a PlayStation video game.

In 2003 he became managing director at Pivotal Games Ltd, a videogame development company based in Bath and owned by SCi Ltd. During his period at the firm it published the series of Conflict: videogames, the most successful of which was Conflict: Desert Storm. He remained as director until 2008, when SCi closed down the company. Between 2005 and 2009 he was also a board member of The Independent Games Developers Association Ltd.

Gamebooks and materials
Jim Bambra produced the following gamebooks and materials for roleplaying games, many in collaboration with other authors:

For Dungeons & Dragons
All That Glitters... – Advanced D&D module, pub. TSR, 1984
Dark Clouds Gather, Advanced D&D module, TSR, 1985
Blade of Vengeance – D&D module, TSR, 1985
Creature Catalogue (Dungeons and Dragons Accessory AC9 ), TSR, 1986 
Night's Dark Terror, 1986. A D&D module, one of the last products of TSR UK
The Golden Khan of Ethengar, D&D Gazetteer, TSR, 1989.
The Sea People, D&D book, TSR, 1990
The Complete Book of Dwarves (Advanced Dungeons and Dragons), 2nd Ed., Player's Handbook Rules Supplement, TSR, 1991.

Other
Dark Side of the Moon (Star Frontiers Module SFAD6), TSR Hobbies, 1985
Warhammer Campaign (The Enemy Within/Shadows Over Bögenhafen), Games Workshop, 1988 
Dead of Night (Fighting Fantasy Gamebook), Puffin Books, 1989
Domain of Evil (Star Wars RPG) Paperback – West End Games, 1991. A supplement to Star Wars RPG.
The GodNet: Virtual Reality in the Cyberpapacy (TORG: Roleplaying the Possibility Wars), Torg gamebook (with Bill Slavisek), West End Games, 1991
The Legacy: Realm of Terror (1993) is a DOS first person perspective RPG game developed by Magnetic Scrolls from an original idea by Jim Bambra, Stephen Hand, Matt Innes, John Oldman.
Warhammer Fantasy Roleplay, Games Workshop Ltd. / Hogshead Publishing Ltd., 1995. This scenario was discussed by Dormans (2006) in a study of pen-and-paper roleplaying games, arguing that a moral stance was implicit in many such games, the scenario of Warhammer Fantasy Roleplay in particular bearing an intentional analogue to the nuclear threat perceived at the time: "... the original setting is a powerful image of what England might have been like during the later stages of the Cold War era: a country living under the constant threat of full-scale war and having already experienced the devastating effects of nuclear disaster. To act and make strategic choices in a world thus infused with meaning can become an act of personal expression and experimentation."

Testimonial
Echoes of the Jedi: Episode IV of Star Wars: Dawn of Defiance was dedicated to "Jim Bambra and all the unsung authors of the early Star Wars Expanded Universe".

References

External links
 Jim Bambra’s Books, Goodreads

1956 births
British company founders
British video game designers
Dungeons & Dragons game designers
Living people
MicroProse people
Warhammer Fantasy Roleplay game designers